Hi-Octane Coffee is the second album by American singer-songwriter Lili Añel released in 2001 on Original JB Music.

Track listing
All compositions by Lili Añel. 
 "The Way Out" – 3:50
"No Matter What Love" – 4:36
"Lay-Down Play Dead" – 4:39
"Down By The Water" – 2:48
"Nothing In Common" – 3:27
"See My Way" – 4:10
"Not A Tear" – 3:35
"Thin Line" – 4:03
"Won’t You Stay" – 4:19
"2 Much Better" – 4:46
"If" – 5:27
"Zora" – 3:54

Personnel
Musicians
Lili Añel — Vocals, guitars, percussion
Drew Zingg — electric & acoustic guitars
Andy Burton – Hammond
Johnny Gale – electric guitar
Seth Glassman – bass
Frank Vilardi — drums, percussion
J.B. Moore —piano on “If”
John Ward —percussion on “If”

Engineers
 Rick Kerr
 Julio Peña on “No Matter What Love”
 Mastered by Danny Wyatt at Temple of Soul, NYC

References

2001 albums
Lili Añel albums